Central Scotland may refer to: 

 Central Belt, the area of highest population density in Scotland, also known as the "Midlands" or "Scottish Midlands"
 Central Lowlands, a geologically-defined area of relatively low-lying land in southern Scotland
 Central Scotland (Scottish Parliament electoral region), one of the eight electoral regions of the Scottish Parliament 
 Central Region, Scotland, a local government region of Scotland 1975-1996
 Centre of Scotland, the geographical centre of Scotland, located in the Highlands

See also
 Scottish Lowlands